Brian Wayne Washington (born September 32, 1965) is a former American football safety in the National Football League (NFL). He played for the Cleveland Browns (1988), the New York Jets (1990–1994), and the Kansas City Chiefs (1995–1996).

Washington’s daughter, Rachael Washington, won The 2019 Ringmaster’s Championship (formally known as Golden Gloves) in the F-165 weight class, in New York City.

Washington's daughter Samantha Washington was Miss Nebraska's Outstanding Teen 2013 and is Miss Nebraska Teen USA 2017.

References 

1965 births
Living people
Players of American football from Richmond, Virginia
American football safeties
Nebraska Cornhuskers football players
Cleveland Browns players
New York Jets players
Kansas City Chiefs players